Alabes is a genus of clingfishes endemic to Australia along the coasts of the Indian and Pacific Oceans.  They are small, eel-like fishes with narrow tapering bodies and small heads.

Species
The currently recognized species in this genus are:
 Alabes bathys Hutchins, 2006
 Alabes brevis V. G. Springer & T. H. Fraser, 1976
 Alabes dorsalis (J. Richardson, 1845) (common shore-eel)
 Alabes elongata Hutchins & S. M. Morrison, 2004
 Alabes gibbosa Hutchins & S. M. Morrison, 2004
 Alabes hoesei V. G. Springer & T. H. Fraser, 1976 (dwarf shore-eel)
 Alabes obtusirostris Hutchins & S. M. Morrison, 2004
 Alabes occidentalis Hutchins & S. M. Morrison, 2004
 Alabes parvula (McCulloch, 1909) (pygmy shore-eel)
 Alabes scotti Hutchins & S. M. Morrison, 2004
 Alabes springeri Hutchins, 2006

References

 
Gobiesocidae
Marine fish genera
Taxa named by Hippolyte Cloquet